The 2012 CECAFA Cup (known as the CECAFA Tusker Challenge Cup for sponsorship reasons) was the 36th edition of the annual CECAFA Cup, an international football competition consisting of national teams of member nations of the Council for East and Central Africa Football Associations (CECAFA). The tournament, which was held in Uganda from 24 November to 8 December, saw South Sudan participate in their first international football tournament. Hosts Uganda beat Kenya in the final to extend their record to 13 titles.

Background

From November 2011, the tournament was planned to take place in Kenya, and preparations already began to take place, including the renovation of the Moi Stadium in Kisumu. However, in August 2012, CECAFA General Secretary Nicholas Musonye stated that it would be moved to Uganda after a request from the tournament sponsors, East African Breweries.  This sparked heated debate between Musonye and Football Kenya Federation (FKF) Chairman Sam Nyamweya, who had even received support from South Sudan to host the tournament in Kenya.

Matches were played at the Namboole Stadium, with a capacity of 45,202. They were also to be played at the Nakivubo Stadium, which can hold 15,000 people. However, CECAFA Secretary General Nicholas Musonye decided to move the remaining group games from the Namboole Stadium since it had been in bad shape due to heavy rains. It was confirmed that on Saturday, 1 December, Somalia would play Tanzania at the Lugogo Stadium at 14:00 UTC+3 while Eritrea would take on Rwanda at the same venue two hours later. On the same day, Sudan were to play Burundi at the Wankulukuku Stadium at 14:00 UTC+3, and finally Malawi to play Zanzibar at the same stadium two hours later.

Participants
The draw for teams to participate in the tournament was held on 12 November 2012. It was originally scheduled for 8 November, but was postponed for undisclosed reasons. Botswana, Cameroon, Ivory Coast, Malawi, Zambia and Zimbabwe had all expressed interest in participating in the tournament. Botswana's interest to join had eventually "fallen off", while Cameroon were not considered as they wanted to send their under-23 team. Ivory Coast and Zambia, having qualified for the 2013 Africa Cup of Nations, were ineligible to enter. The Confederation of African Football (CAF) rules do not allow teams to compete in another competition within a two-month period of the Africa Cup of Nations. Ethiopia also qualified for the 2013 Africa Cup of Nations, but still took part as they are members of CECAFA. On 6 November 2012, the Football Association of Malawi announced that they had been officially invited to the tournament as a guest team.  They replaced Djibouti, who pulled out due to administrative reasons.

Tournament sponsors East African Breweries set a US$450,000 budget for the tournament, including US$30,000 as prize money for the winning team. The runners-up and third-placed teams received US$20,000 and US$10,000 respectively.

The following teams were confirmed to participate in the tournament:

 (invitee)

 (host)

Match officials
The following 16 officials were appointed by CECAFA to participate in the tournament.

Referees

  Thierry Nkurunziza
  Mensur Maeruf
  Anthony Ogwayo
  Louis Hakizimana
  Mohamed El Fadhil
  Israel Mujuni
  Dennis Batte
  Ali Kalyango

Assistant referees

  Mussie Kindie
  Peter Sabatia
  Ambroise Hakizimana
  Omar Abukar
  Mohammed Idam
  Klemence Erasmo
  Mark Ssonko
  Ali Kinduli

Squads

Group stage

The group stage began on 24 November and ended on 1 December. The matchdays were 24, 25, 26, 27, 28, 29 and 30 November and 1 December.

If two or more teams are equal on points on completion of the group matches, the following criteria are applied to determine the rankings (in descending order):

 Number of points obtained in games between the teams involved;
 Goal difference in games between the teams involved;
 Goals scored in games between the teams involved;
 Away goals scored in games between the teams involved;
 Goal difference in all games;
 Goals scored in all games;
 Drawing of lots.

Group A

Group B

Group C

Third place qualification
In addition to the group stage winners and runners-up, the two best third-placed teams were ranked at the end of the group stage to determine who would qualify for the knockout stage.

Knockout stage

The knockout stage began on 3 December with the quarter-finals and ended on 8 December with the final. In this stage, teams play against each other once. The losers of the semi-finals play against each other in a third place playoff where the winner is placed third overall in the entire competition.

Bracket

Quarter-finals
The quarter-finals were played on 3–4 December 2012.

|}

Semi-finals
The semi-finals were played on 6 December 2012.

|}

Third place playoff

Final

Top scorers

Awards
Player of the Tournament:  Brian Umony
Top goalscorer of the Tournament:  Robert Ssentongo
Goalkeeper of the Tournament:  Hamza Muwonge

Final rankings

Teams are ranked using the same tie-breaking criteria as in the group stage, except for the top four teams.

|-
|colspan="14"|04Eliminated in the quarter-finals
|-

|-
|colspan="14"|08Eliminated in the group stage
|-

See also
 2012 CECAFA Cup schedule
 2012 Kagame Interclub Cup

References

External links
 

 
CECAFA Cup
CECAFA Cup
CECAFA Cup
CECAFA Cup
International association football competitions hosted by Uganda
CECAFA Cup